Abhijit Das (born 10 July 1987) is an Indian professional footballer who plays as a goalkeeper for Bhawanipore in the Calcutta Football League.

Career

United
Abhijit signed his first professional contract at the age of 23 for Southern Samity and represented the club for three years. Born in Kolkata, West Bengal, Das made his professional debut for United S.C. on 10 December 2013 against Dempo at the Salt Lake Stadium after both of United's first two choice goalkeepers, Sangram Mukherjee and Ishan Debnath, were revealed to be injured.

Salgaocar
On 18 June 2014 it was announced that Abhijit has signed for Salgaocar F.C. on a three-year deal.

Career statistics

Personal life
Abhijit is a fan of Manchester United, Uruguay national football team and Diego Forlan is his favourite player.

References

External links 
 United S.C. squad with players profile.

1987 births
Living people
Footballers from Kolkata
Indian footballers
United SC players
Salgaocar FC players
Association football goalkeepers
I-League players